Gustavo Julian Garcia Jr. (September 27, 1972 – February 16, 2016) was an American prisoner from  McKinney, Texas, who was executed for the 1990 murder of Craig Turski.

Profile
Craig Turski, 43, was murdered on December 9, 1990, during the robbery of the Warehouse Beverage Store in Plano, Texas. Garcia, then 18, entered the store and demanded cash as he displayed a sawed-off shotgun. As the victim attempted to escape, Garcia shot Turski in the abdomen, reloaded, and then fatally shot him in the back of the head.

Garcia also participated in a robbery of a Texaco station on January 5, 1991, where he was arrested. Gregory Martin, an 18-year-old clerk, was killed during the course of that robbery. His co-defendant was 16-year-old Christopher Vargas, who received a life sentence for capital murder charges. Shelia Maria Garcia, the common-law wife of Gustavo Julian Garcia, was also arrested and received a 20-year sentence on conspiracy to commit robbery.  Shelia Garcia was paroled in January 1999.

Incarceration
Garcia arrived on death row on January 8, 1992. He was initially located in the Ellis Unit, but was transferred to the Allan B. Polunsky Unit (formerly the Terrell Unit) in 1999.

Garcia attempted to escape the Ellis Unit death row on Thanksgiving Day 1998, along with six other prisoners, but was arrested after surrendering. Martin Gurule was able to escape but was shot and subsequently drowned.

Garcia received a new sentencing hearing in 2001 after then-Attorney General of Texas John Cornyn learned that Walter Quijano, a psychologist who testified in the trial, had stated at the original trial that black and Hispanic men were more dangerous to society since there were more of them in prison. However, Garcia was again sentenced to death. He resided on Texas's death row for over 25 years before he was executed on February 16, 2016.

See also
 Capital punishment in Texas
 List of people executed in Texas, 2010–2019
 List of people executed in the United States in 2016

References 

1972 births
2016 deaths
1990 murders in the United States
1991 murders in the United States
21st-century executions by Texas
21st-century executions of American people
American people convicted of murder
People convicted of murder by Texas
People executed by Texas by lethal injection
People from McKinney, Texas
People executed for murder